The Calcasieu Ship Channel is a waterway that connects the city of Lake Charles, Louisiana, with the Gulf of Mexico. Its existence allows the Port of Lake Charles, which is more than 30 miles from the Gulf, to be the 11th largest seaport in the United States. The primary use of the channel is the importation of materials for processing in Lake Charles' large refinery industry, including petroleum, liquefied natural gas, and the export of refined products, such as gasoline and chemicals.

Constructed in the 1920s, the channel is a combination of natural lakes, streams, and man-made cuts. Over the years, as ships have grown larger, the channel has had increasing difficulty in accommodating contemporary ships. In June, 2009, the Army Corps of Engineers agreed to dredge the channel and bring it up to modern standards.

References

Transportation in Louisiana
Buildings and structures in Lake Charles, Louisiana
1920s establishments in Louisiana